{{Infobox cricket team
| name             = Guyana
| image            = Flag of Guyana.svg
| alt              = Refer to caption
| caption          = Flag of Guyana

| captain          = Shemaine Campbelle
| coach            = Julian Moore

| founded          = First recorded match: 1977
| ground           = Providence Stadium, Providence

| first_fc         = Barbados
| first_fc_year    = 1977
| first_fc_venue   = Tanteen Recreation Ground, St. George's

| title1           = S50
| title1wins       = 0
| title2           = T20 Blaze
| title2wins       = 0

| website          =
}}

The Guyana women's cricket team is the women's representative cricket team of the country of Guyana. They compete in the Women's Super50 Cup and the Twenty20 Blaze.

History
Guyana joined the West Indies domestic structure in 1977, competing in the Federation Championships, in which they finished 4th out of 5 teams. They competed again in the next edition of the tournament, 1980, winning two matches, against Grenada and Barbados.

Guyana then did not compete in any tournaments until 2001, losing every match in their return season. They have competed in most tournaments since, with a brief hiatus in 2006 and 2007, and joined the Twenty20 Blaze for its inaugural season in 2012. In 2013, they reached the semi-finals of the T20 competition before losing to eventual winners Jamaica. They achieved their best finish in the 50-over competition in 2014, reaching the final before losing to Jamaica. 

In the most recent season, 2022, Guyana finished 4th in the Twenty20 Blaze and reached the semi-finals of the Super50 Cup, with both tournaments held in Guyana.

Players
Current squad
Based on squad announced for the 2022 season. Players in bold have international caps.

Notable players
Players who have played for Guyana and played internationally are listed below, in order of first international appearance (given in brackets):

  Candacy Atkins (2003)
  Indomatie Goordial-John (2003)
  Shemaine Campbell (2009)
  Tremayne Smartt (2009)
  Subrina Munroe (2010)
  June Ogle (2011)
  Erva Giddings (2016)
  Onika Wallerson (2019)
  Shabika Gajnabi (2019)
  Sheneta Grimmond (2019)
  Cherry-Ann Fraser (2020)
  Mandy Mangru (2022)
  Kaysia Schultz (2022)

Honours
 Women's Super50 Cup:
 Winners (0):
 Best finish: Runners-up (2014)
 Twenty20 Blaze:
 Winners (0):
 Best finish:'' Semi-finals (2013)

See also
 Guyana national cricket team
 Guyana Amazon Warriors (WCPL)

Notes

References

Cricket
Women's national cricket teams
Women's cricket in Guyana
Women's cricket teams in the West Indies